Michael Byskov (born February 20, 1988) is a Danish professional footballer who plays for the reserve team of AaB as a playing assistant manager.

References

External links

1988 births
Living people
Danish men's footballers
Danish expatriate men's footballers
OKC Energy FC players
Association football midfielders
Expatriate soccer players in the United States
USL Championship players